All Things New is a Christian Contemporary-Americana-Folk-Southern pop band from Deltona, Florida. They are on the BEC Recordings label.

Background
All Things New is from Deltona, Florida.

Music

EP's
The band released an EP called "Seek the Love" in 2009. The band also released an EP that was called Overcome in 2011, which was done independently.

All Things New
Their first full-length studio album was released on April 9, 2013 -- All Things New, which was with BEC Recordings, and was produced by Casey Brown and Jonathan Smith.

Discography

Album

References

External links
 
 K-LOVE profile
 All Things New at CCM Artists

Musical groups established in 2008
Musical groups from Orlando, Florida
BEC Recordings artists